Denzel Rae Don Curry (born February 16, 1995) is an American rapper, singer, and songwriter. Born and raised in Carol City, Florida, Curry started rapping while in the sixth grade and began working on his first mixtape in 2011. Influenced by underground Florida rapper SpaceGhostPurrp, the mixtape was later featured on Purrp's social media, giving Curry attention in the local music scene and resulting in him joining Purrp's hip-hop collective Raider Klan.

Curry left Raider Klan in 2013, releasing his debut studio album, Nostalgic 64, in September of that year, while still in high school. He has since released three extended plays: 32 Zel/Planet Shrooms in 2015, 13 in 2017, and Unlocked (a collaboration with Kenny Beats) in 2020, and four studio albums: Imperial in 2016, Ta13oo in 2018, Zuu in 2019, and Melt My Eyez See Your Future in 2022. Ta13oo, Zuu, and Melt My Eyez debuted at numbers 28, 32, and 51 on the Billboard 200 chart, respectively, with Melt My Eyez returning at number 17 after the release of an extended edition.  All of his projects have garnered significant critical acclaim.

Early life
Denzel Rae Don Curry was born on February 16, 1995, in Carol City, Florida. He is of Bahamian descent through both his mother and father. Curry started down an artist's path with early poetry ambitions in elementary school before he began rapping in the sixth grade. His time was spent at a local Boys & Girls Clubs of America chapter where he challenged others to rap battles. He attended Miami's Design and Architecture High School for two years before being expelled. Curry then attended Miami Carol City Senior High School, where he started working on Nostalgic 64 while still attending class. In a 2018 interview with The Breakfast Club, Curry disclosed that he was molested by an unnamed older male during his childhood.

Career

2011–2012: Career beginnings
On September 24, 2011, Curry released his first mixtape, titled King Remembered Underground Tape 1991–1995. The whole project that Curry posted was later included on SpaceGhostPurrp's page, which prompted the birth of Denzel's music career. Following the release of Curry's first mixtape, Curry became a member of SpaceGhostPurrp's hip hop group, Raider Klan.

In 2012, he released his second mixtape, titled King of the Mischievous South Vol. 1 Underground Tape 1996, which caught the attention of fellow American rapper Earl Sweatshirt and other members of the Odd Future label.

Curry's third mixtape, titled Strictly for My R.V.I.D.X.R.Z., was released after the death of Trayvon Martin, who also lived in Carol City and went to the same high school as Denzel Curry. His style of rap and the name of the record were heavily inspired by Tupac Shakur.

In late 2012, Curry met his manager Mark Maturah, and under his guidance, released his first studio single, "Dark & Violent", featuring J. K. The Reaper and Nell, to SoundCloud.

In 2021, a mixtape named "Curry Wuz Here" surfaced on YouTube, and the release date was claimed to be January 16, 2011.

2013–2014: Nostalgic 64

The group Raider Klan was disbanded, which led to Curry deciding to embark on his solo rap career. On September 3, 2013, Curry released his debut full-length album, titled Nostalgic 64. The album features guest appearances from JK the Reaper, Lil Ugly Mane, Mike G, Nell, Robb Bank$, Stephen A. Clark, and Yung Simmie, among others. In 2014, Curry was featured on Deniro Farrar's track, called "Bow Down" (included from Farrar's Rebirth EP) and Curry was featured on Dillon Cooper's track, called "Eyes of the World" (included from Cooper's X:XX mixtape). Curry himself has stated that he was heavily inspired by Outkast's record, Aquemini, saying he drew the cover for Nostalgic 64 while listening to the record. He also was inspired by Goodie Mob and CeeLo Green, and other southern music.

2015–2016: 32 Zel/Planet Shrooms and Imperial

On June 9, 2015, Curry released his first double EP, 32 Zel/Planet Shrooms, which contained his breakout single "Ultimate". The song went viral, and was played over Bottle Flip videos among others. It has amassed over 175 million streams on Spotify and earned 65 million views on YouTube. His first release in 2016 was the single "Flying Nimbus".

His second full-length album, titled Imperial, was released on March 9, 2016, then re-released later on Spotify as the deluxe version on October 14, 2016.
 
In June 2016, Curry appeared in XXL magazine as part of their 2016 Freshmen Class. As part of this appearance, Curry performed a 'freshman cypher' alongside Lil Uzi Vert, Lil Yachty, 21 Savage, and Kodak Black. As of March 2021, this cypher has received over 180 million YouTube views, by far the most for the XXL channel.

2017–2018: 13 and Ta13oo 

On May 13, 2017, Curry uploaded a track titled "Hate Government [demo]" to his SoundCloud account. In the weeks that followed, he released two more demos for songs titled "Equalizer [demo]" and "Zeltron 6 Billion" featuring Lil Ugly Mane. After these releases as well as a series of cryptic posts on social media (seemingly portraying another alter ego called Zeltron), he released an EP titled 13 on June 25, 2017. All of the demo tracks were included on the EP as well as two other new songs. On August 18, 2017, Curry released another song called "Skywalker." Later that year, on September 22, a remastered version of 32 Zel was released, including a remix of "Ultimate" featuring Juicy J.

Since he started releasing demos for songs on 13, Curry made several mentions of his third studio album titled, Ta13oo. 13 serves as a sampler to Ta13oo, and no release date for the album was announced. On February 28, 2018, he appeared on the song "Kristi," by artist ASAP Ferg, which also featured IDK. It was first performed live in Austin, TX on March 10, during their collaborative tour. On March 16, 2018, he uploaded the song "Uh Huh," once again featuring IDK, onto his official YouTube channel.

On April 2, 2018, Curry released the lead single off of Ta13oo titled "Sumo" on Zane Lowe's Beats 1 radio show. On May 24, 2018, Curry released the second single off the album titled, "Percs". Curry then released the third single titled, "Clout Cobain", on July 13, 2018, and announced that his album Ta13oo, would be released in three acts: The first act, Light, was released on July 25, followed by Gray on July 26, and Dark on July 27. Each previously-released single represents one of the album's acts, as "Sumo" represents Light, "Clout Cobain" represents Gray, and "Percs" represents Dark, which come together cohesively to form Ta13oo.

2019–2021: Zuu, 13lood In + 13lood Out, and Unlocked

On February 14, 2019, Curry performed a cover of "Bulls on Parade" by Rage Against the Machine on the Australian radio station Triple J as part of Like a Version, which was met with widespread acclaim. His cover went on to place 5th on that year's Triple J Hottest 100 countdown.

On May 8, 2019, Curry released "Ricky", his first single since the release of Ta13oo. The song is titled after his father, whom the song is inspired by. On May 22, 2019, Curry released a second single title "Speedboat" and announced the release of his next album Zuu for May 31, 2019.

On July 15, 2019, Curry made his television debut on The Tonight Show Starring Jimmy Fallon, performing a medley of "Ricky" and "Wish" from his album Zuu. He also revealed that he had cut his signature dreadlocks.

On July 24th, 2019, Curry joined artists such as Germ, City Morgue, Trash Talk, Shoreline Mafia, Night Lovell, Pouya, and Turnstile on a nationwide tour titled "Grey Day Tour", which was created by the hip-hop duo $uicideboy$. The tour was completed almost a month later on August 23rd, 2019.

On January 6, 2020, Curry released a project titled 13lood 1n + 13lood Out, featuring fellow rappers Ghostemane, Xavier Wulf, ZillaKami and AK of The Underachievers. The project was initially announced in November 2018.

On February 7, 2020, Curry released Unlocked, an EP collaboration with Kenny Beats. The release was accompanied with an animated short film. In August 2020, Curry was featured on the soundtrack to the Madden NFL 21 game, on the song "Lemonade", with singer Yungblud. In October 2020, Curry was featured on $NOT's track "Sangria".

On March 5, 2021, Curry released Unlocked 1.5, a remix of his previous collaboration with Kenny Beats. The remix album features new production from Robert Glasper, The Alchemist, Georgia Anne Muldrow, Sango, Jay Versace, Godmode, and Charlie Heat, as well as new features from Smino, Joey Bada$$, and Benny the Butcher among others.

In June 2021, Curry appeared on FX Network's "The Choe Show", alongside David Choe.

Curry was featured on the September 2021 song "Bleach", released on rapper ZillaKami's debut album, DOG BOY.

Curry collaborated on the track "Dynasties and Dystopia" from the Netflix series Arcane, alongside Gizzle and Bren Joy.

2022: Melt My Eyez See Your Future

On January 5, 2022, the official trailer for Curry's fifth studio album, titled Melt My Eyez See Your Future, was uploaded to his YouTube channel. It was revealed that the album would contain guest appearances from artists such as T-Pain, 6lack, Slowthai, Rico Nasty, J.I.D, and Thundercat, among others. Curry said the project would feature a new, more mature sound, different from his previous works: "Y'all are not going to hear the same type of Denzel anymore." On January 24, a single titled "Walkin", along with a Western-inspired music video directed by Adrian Villagomez, was released. Curry also said the album "is made up of everything that I couldn't [include] on Ta13oo or Imperial because I was going through depression [and] anger issues", and would take inspiration from traditional hip-hop, drum and bass, trap, poetry, and jazz. The same day, a North American and European tour promoting the album (with guest acts Kenny Mason, Mike Dimes, Redveil, and PlayThatBoiZay) was announced. On February 24, Curry released another single from the upcoming album, "Zatoichi" featuring Slowthai. It was accompanied by a music video also directed by Adrian Villagomez. On March 18, Curry announced the album would be released on March 25. On March 21, a third single, "Troubles" featuring T-Pain, was released along with a music video. The album was released on March 25, 2022. It debuted at number 51 on the Billboard 200 chart, and at number 23 on the Billboard Top R&B/Hip-Hop Albums chart.

Curry recorded a song featuring rapper Reason, "1st Quarter", as a contribution to Apple Music's "collection of exclusively commissioned new songs from Black creatives", titled Juneteenth 2022: Freedom Songs. He commented: "It's an accomplishment to make it through the first quarter of my life. Especially as a Black man in America".

Curry's song featuring PlayThatBoiZay, "Let It All Hang Out", was included in Elvis—a biographical movie about Elvis Presley that premiered in June 2022—as well as on the movie's soundtrack album.

On June 24, 2022, a collaboration between Dot da Genius, JID, Curry, and Kid Cudi, titled "Talk About Me", was released, along with a music video directed by Cole Bennett.

On June 29, 2022, Curry performed an NPR Tiny Desk Concert. On July 21, he performed "Walkin" on The Tonight Show Starring Jimmy Fallon.

On September 30, 2022, Curry released Melt My Eyez See Your Future (The Extended Edition). The album features reimagined versions of songs from the original album with live instrumentation performed by the Cold Blooded Soul Band, which performed with Curry on his NPR Tiny Desk Concert and The Tonight Show performance.

Personal life
On February 27, 2014, Curry's brother, Treon "Tree" Johnson, died as a result of complications after being tased by the police in Hialeah, Florida. Officers had responded to an emergency call made by a man claiming that Johnson was beating two dogs with a metal pipe. Officers then employed physical force, pepper spray, and a taser in an attempt to restrain Johnson. He succumbed to his wounds, and he ultimately died after being transported to Jackson Memorial Hospital. His family argued that the incident was a case of police brutality. Curry has spoken about Johnson's death and police brutality in interviews and in his music. One example of this is the lyric "Cops killing' blacks when the whites do the most," in his song "The Last."  

Curry always expressed his love for art, with many different comic books and anime shows inspiring him to draw.

Until January 2017, Curry lived with XXXTentacion, Ronny J and other members of his C9 collective in Miami in the self-called ULT House. As he himself stated in an interview with Montreality, after he had broke up with his girlfriend, he painted his whole room, and to support him other people living in the ULT House drew all over their walls too. He has since lived in Los Angeles.

In January 2021, Curry found out that he is related to St. Louis rapper Smino through the discovery of a shared uncle.

Discography

 Nostalgic 64 (2013)
 Imperial (2016)
 Ta13oo (2018)
 Zuu (2019)
 Melt My Eyez See Your Future (2022)
 Designed by Angels (TBA)

Tours

Headlining
 Illegal Civ Cinema Tour (2017)
 Ta13oo Tour (2018)
 Melt My Eyez Tour (2022)

Supporting
 Joey Bada$$ – World Domination Tour (2015)
 Boogie – Black Metal Terrorist Tour (2016)
 Run the Jewels – Run the World Tour (2017)
 A$AP Ferg – Mad Man Tour (2018)
 $uicideboy$ – GreyDay Tour (2019)
 Billie Eilish – When We All Fall Asleep Tour (2019)
 Kid Cudi – To The Moon Tour (2022)

References

External links

1995 births
Living people
21st-century American rappers
21st-century African-American male singers
African-American male rappers
African-American male singer-songwriters
Alternative hip hop musicians
American industrial musicians
American hip hop singers
American people of Bahamian descent
Hardcore hip hop artists
Loma Vista Recordings artists
People from Carol City, Florida
Rappers from Florida
Singer-songwriters from Florida
Trap metal musicians
Universal Music Group artists